Leonard Gibbs is an American percussionist.

Leonard Gibbs may also refer to:

Leonard Gibbs (assemblyman) (1800–1863), New York assemblyman 1838
Leonard W. H. Gibbs (1875–1930), New York assemblyman and state senator